Palaquium hexandrum is a tree in the family Sapotaceae. The specific epithet hexandrum means "six stamens", referring to the flowers.

Description
The bark is dark brown. The inflorescences bear up to 18 flowers.

Distribution and habitat
Palaquium hexandrum is native to Sumatra, Peninsular Malaysia and Borneo. Its habitat is lowland forests, sometimes riverine.

Uses
The seeds of Palaquium hexandrum are used in cooking. The latex is used to make gutta-percha. The timber is harvested and traded as nyatoh.

Conservation
Palaquium hexandrum has been assessed as near threatened on the IUCN Red List. The significant threat to the species is deforestation: in Peninsular Malaysia and Borneo for conversion of land to palm oil cultivation.

References

hexandrum
Trees of Sumatra
Trees of Peninsular Malaysia
Trees of Borneo
Plants described in 1854
Taxa named by Henri Ernest Baillon
Taxa named by William Griffith (botanist)